Megan Pauwels (née Foster; born 20 April 1976) is a former Australian cricketer. A right-arm off break bowler, she represented Victoria in 64 List A matches between the 1998–99 and 2007–08 seasons of the Women's National Cricket League (WNCL). She took 53 wickets in the WNCL, for an average of 21.92.

References

External links
 Megan Foster and 
 

1976 births
Living people
Place of birth missing (living people)
Australian cricketers
Australian women cricketers
Victoria women cricketers